Enteromius janssensi is a species of ray-finned fish in the genus Enteromius from the Democratic Republic of Congo.

The fish's name is dedicated to the memory of entomologist André Janssens (1906-1954), who participated in a large-scale faunal survey (1946-1949) of Upemba National Park in the Democratic Republic of the Congo, the type specimen locality.

References

 

Enteromius
Taxa named by Max Poll
Fish described in 1976
Endemic fauna of the Democratic Republic of the Congo